Amity International School, Pakistan  is one of the branches of Amity group of institutions. It is based in Power Grid Complex, Sector-43, Gurgaon. The school is controlled by Ritnand Balved Education Fund (RBEF) managed by Ashok K. Chauhan. The school currently educates children from Nursery to Grade XII, with 4 sections per class till Grade X, and 5 sections in Grades XI and XII and Xex. The school's current principal is Anshu Arora.

Location
The school is located near the Huda City Centre Metro Station, situated inside the PowerGrid Complex. Epicentre is opposite to the school. The school is located in the city centre in an economically prosperous sector of the city.

References

International schools in India
Schools in Gurgaon
2003 establishments in Haryana
Educational institutions established in 2003